Sir John Peebles Arbuthnott, PPRSE, FRCPSG, FMedSci, FRCPath (8 April 1939 - 21 February 2023)  was a Scottish microbiologist, and was Principal of the University of Strathclyde. He succeeded Lord Wilson of Tillyorn as President of The Royal Society of Edinburgh in October 2011 and was succeeded by Dame Jocelyn Bell Burnell in October 2014.

He served as Principal and Vice Chancellor of the University of Strathclyde between 1991 and 2000.

Education
Arbuthnott was educated at Hyndland Senior Secondary School, the University of Glasgow(BSc, PhD), and Trinity College, Dublin (MA, ScD). In 1998, he was made a Knight Bachelor for services to education.

In December 1997, while Principal and Vice-Chancellor of the University of Strathclyde, Arbuthnott chaired the National Review of Resource Allocation ("The Arbuthnott Report" and "the Arbuthnott Review". The principal task of the independent review was to consider how money was allocated annually to fund the 14 Scottish NHS Boards. The resulting mechanism, known as the Arbuthnott Formula, assesses key indicators of population, inequality and deprivation of the areas covered by each of the boards to allocate money.

He was chair of the Arbuthnott Commission set up in 2004 to consider the consequences of having four separate voting systems for elections in Scotland and also different boundaries for Holyrood and Westminster constituencies.

Professional posts 

 University of Glasgow:
 Assistant lecturer, 1960–1963
 Lecturer, 1963–1967
 New York Medical Center: Visiting lecturer, 1966–1967
 Royal Society of London: Research fellow, 1968–72
 University of Glasgow: Senior lecturer, Department of Bacteriology, 1972–1975
 Trinity College, Dublin:
 Professor of microbiology 1976-1988
 Bursar, 1983–86
 University of Nottingham: Professor of microbiology 1988-1991
 University of Strathclyde, Glasgow: Principal and Vice-Chancellor, 1991–2000

Professional committee work 

 Chairman, Expert Group on Labour's plan for National Care Service
 Chairman, Joint Information Systems Committee, 1993–98
 Chairman, Greater Glasgow Health Board, November 2002-
 Chairman, Commission Report on Boundary Differences and Voting Systems, 2005-6
 Convener, Committee of Scottish Higher Education Principals, 1994–1996
 Convener, National Review of Allocation of Health Resources in Scotland, 1997–1999
 Vice Chairman, CVCP, 1997–99
 Dr Campbell Christie and Arbuthnott [reports on public service delivery and resource allocation]
 Secretary-Treasurer, Carnegie Trust for the Universities of Scotland, 2000-
 Member of the council, Society of General Microbiology 1981–1986, (senior ed 1980–1984, treasurer 1987–1992)
 Meetings secretary, Federation of European Microbiology Societies, 1986–1990
 Member, Microbiological Safety of Food Committee, 1989–1990
 Member, AFRC Animal Research Board, 1989–1992
 Member, Public Health Laboratory Service Board, 1991–1997
 Member, DTI Multimedia Advisory Group, 1994–1996
 Member, Educational Counselling Service Board, British Council, 1995–1996
 Member, Glasgow Development Agency, 1995-
 Member, National Committee of Inquiry into Higher Education, 1996–97
 Member, Scottish Science Trust, 1999
 Member, Pathological Society

Professional honours 

 Honorary fellow, Trinity College, Dublin 1992
 MRIA 1985
 FSB 1988
 FRSA 1989
 FRSE 1993
 FIIB 1993
 FRCPath 1995
 Honorary degree of Lodz University of Technology, Poland, May 1995
 Hon FRCPGlasg
 St Mungo Prize 2010
 Hon Doctor of Science St Margaret University, Edinburgh, July 2000

Publications

References

External links 

  NHS Scotland Resource Allocation Committee

1939 births
Living people
Academics of the University of Glasgow
Academics of the University of Nottingham
Alumni of the University of Glasgow
Alumni of Trinity College Dublin
John
Fellows of the Academy of Medical Sciences (United Kingdom)
Fellows of the Royal College of Pathologists
Fellows of the Royal College of Physicians and Surgeons of Glasgow
Fellows of Trinity College Dublin
Knights Bachelor
Members of the Royal Irish Academy
People associated with the University of Strathclyde
People educated at Hyndland Secondary School
Presidents of the Royal Society of Edinburgh
Scottish knights
Scottish microbiologists
Scottish pathologists
Scottish scholars and academics